Gamma-interferon-inducible protein Ifi-16 (Ifi-16) also known as interferon-inducible myeloid differentiation transcriptional activator is a protein that in humans is encoded by the IFI16 gene.

Function 

This gene encodes a member of the HIN-200 (hematopoietic interferon-inducible nuclear antigens with 200 amino acid repeats) family of cytokines. The encoded protein contains domains involved in DNA binding, transcriptional regulation, and protein-protein interactions. The protein localizes to the nucleoplasm and nucleoli, and interacts with p53, retinoblastoma-1 and BRCA1. It modulates p53 function, and inhibits cell growth in the Ras/Raf signaling pathway. IFI16 has been shown to play a role in the sensing of intracellular DNA - a hallmark of virally infected cells - and has also been linked to the death of HIV-infected helper CD4 T cells by pyroptosis, a highly inflammatory form of programmed cell death. Recently, it has been shown how IFI16, once extracellularly released, can induce inflammation upon TLR4 binding, acting as a DAMP.

References

Further reading

External links 
 

Transcription factors